Devru is a 2009 Indian Kannada-language film directed by Sadhu Kokila, starring Duniya Vijay and Pragna in lead roles. The film is a remake of the Malayalam film Abhimanyu (1991).

Cast

 Duniya Vijay as Devru 
 Pragna as Divya
 Ashish Vidyarthi as Dhanush 
 Ravi Kale as Ram Reddy
 Rockline Venkatesh 
 Shobaraj
 PN Satya as Aadi
 Yathiraj

Music

Reception

Critical response 

The Times of India scored the film at 2.5 out of 5 stars and says "Vijay is simply superb, especially in action sequences, which are his forte. Pragna excels in the climax and has the potential to be a star. Ravikale, Ashish Vidyarthi, Shobhraj and Yathiraj do justice to their roles. Camerawork by J G Krishna is good. Thushar Ranganath has penned some catchy dialogues. The music is okay, but the comedy sequences are average". R G Vijayasarathy of Rediff.com scored the film at 2 out of 5 stars and says "Surprisingly Sadhu's music comes as a dampener. J G Krishna scores well in his camera work. Like many other remakes, Devaru follows the original and ends up as an ordinary fare". The New Indian Express wrote "Devru and makes his life miserable. You have to watch the film to know if Devru wins his battle against Ram Reddy and his henchmen, including the ACP. Some of the songs, especially the item song, are mainly meant for the front benchers. Dialogues are powerful and punchy". BSS of Deccan Herald wrote "True, there is Vijay, all-rounder in acting, dancing and fighting. There is Sadhu himself, whose raised eyebrow is enough to bring out a giggle. There are Ravi Kale, Ashish Vidyarthi and Shobhraj. But none of their characters settles with the viewers, with Sadhu running a swift race, all the while ignoring bystanders substance, cohesion and credibility".Sify Wrote "Director Sadhu Kokila also a music director and comedy actor falls below average in his three responsibilities. None of the songs are worth hearing again. JG Krishna does a good job with the camera".

References

2000s Kannada-language films
2009 films
Kannada remakes of Malayalam films